Shaakuntalam is an upcoming Indian Telugu-language historical drama film written and directed by Gunasekhar. It is produced by Neelima Guna under Gunaa Teamworks and distributed by Sri Venkateswara Creations. Based on a popular play Abhignyana Shakuntalam by Kalidasa, the film features Samantha in the titular role of Shakuntala and Dev Mohan as Dushyanta, the king of Puru dynasty along with Mohan Babu, Jisshu Sengupta, Madhoo, Gautami, Aditi Balan and Ananya Nagalla in supporting roles.

The project was announced in October 2020 by Gunasekhar. The film's production began in February 2021 at Annapurna Studios in Hyderabad and ended in August 2021. The film was shot extensively around Hyderabad, including Ramoji Film City, Ananthagiri Hills, and Gandipet Lake. The film is scheduled for a theatrical release on 14 April 2023.

Premise

Cast 
Samantha Ruth Prabhu as Shakuntala
Dev Mohan as Dushyanta
Sachin Khedekar as Kanva Maharishi
Mohan Babu as Durvasa Maharishi
Aditi Balan as Anasuya
Ananya Nagalla as Priyamvada 
Prakash Raj as TBA
Gautami as Gautami
Madhoo as Menaka
Kabir Bedi as Kashyapa Maharishi
Jisshu Sengupta as Indra Deva
Kabir Duhan Singh as King Asura 
Allu Arha as Prince Bharata
Varshini Sounderajan
Harish Uthaman

Production

Development
In 2017, director Gunasekhar announced a magnum opus Hiranya Kashyapa with Rana Daggubati as the lead. The film was based on the famous historical epic tale of the Asura, Hiranyakashipu. In October 2020, the director announced that the pre-production of Hiranya Kashyapa was completed during the COVID-19 pandemic, the shooting process of the film will not start in the near future. Later in November, Gunasekher announced the film based on Kalidasa's 4th century play Shakuntala which tells the story of the legendary princess Shakuntala and king Dushyanta.

Casting

Soon after the announcement, reports suggested that the makers have approached actress Anushka Shetty for the lead role of Shakuntala after the collaboration of the actress and director Gunasekhar in the 2015 historical drama, Rudhramadevi which did not materialize. During December 2020, actress Samantha Ruth Prabhu was confirmed to be cast as the lead actress to portray Shakuntala.

Later in the year, Malayalam actor Dev Mohan and Telugu actress Eesha Rebba were approached for the film, with Mohan reportedly playing Dushyant and Eesha Rebba supposed character unknown. In March 2021, media mentioned that Rebba has walked out of the project due to several reason. In March 2021, Samantha has taken her social media to announce that Dev Mohan is officially a part of the project as Dushyant. Veteran actor Mohan Babu was also cast in the film. He was reportedly playing the hot-tempered Durvasa Maharishi and Aditi Balan was replacing Rebba in the film. It was reported that both Gautami and Prakash Raj was also featuring in Shaakuntalam. 

Reports came around that the director will be approaching Jr NTR's son Abhay Ram or Allu Arjun's son Allu Ayaan to feature in as Shakuntala's son Bharata, but Allu Arjun's daughter Allu Arha is having her maiden debut in this production as said character. Actress Ananya Nagalla and Varshini Sounderajan confirmed of being a part in the film through respective interviews while actress Madhoo also joined the cast.Kabir Duhan Singh also joined the cast to play the role of King Asura.

Filming
The film is set in the Northern of India in the backdrop of Hastinapr, parts of Kashmir and the banks of Himalaya. Makers have signed art director Ashok Kolarath to handle the set. The team has also hired National Awardee fashion designer Neeta Lulla who has also worked with Gunasekhar in Rudhramadevi. The pooja and the principal photography of Shaakuntalam was kickstarted on 15 March 2021 at Annapurna Studios. It was revealed that Sekhar V. Joseph and Bishwadeep Chatterjee was also signed in for the project to handle the cinematography and sound design for the film respectively.

The first schedule of filming was started on late March with Samantha Ruth Prabhu, Dev Mohan and Aditi Balan at Annapurna Studios in Hyderabad. But due to the second wave of COVID-19 pandemic in India, the shooting was halted towards the end of June. During an interview, Gunasekhar has stated that almost 50% of filming has been completed on late June. The shooting will be recommenced during the end of June back at Annapurna Studios, then later in Ramoji Film City. Reportedly, Samantha Ruth Prabhu joined the second schedule of filming along with Dev Mohan and Aditi Balan. Several scenes were shot in Ananthagiri Hills and Vikarabad Forests with actor Dev Mohan. Several scenes were shot in Gandipet Lake in July 2021. The filming was finished on the last week of August 2021 at Annapurna Studios.

Post-production
The visual and graphics department is handled by industry professional Alagarsamy Maayan, with talents from Canada, Hong Kong and China working on the VFX to get the visualisation right. Director Gunasekhar has confirmed that the post production might be longer than 10 months, considering the vision of the director to be met. Samantha completed her dubbing portions in April 2022.She is dubbing for herself in Telugu, Tamil and Hindi. The makers reported in January 2022 that Allu Arha had completed the dubbing for her role for the film.

Soundtrack 

The film's music for all versions is composed by Mani Sharma.

Release
Shaakuntalam was scheduled to be released theatrically on 4 November 2022 alongside dubbed versions in Tamil, Hindi, Malayalam and Kannada but was later postponed due to the film being chosen to be converted into 3D format. .The creators of Shaakuntalam announced that the film will not hit the screens on February 17 and they will share the new release date soon.  On 10 February 2023, a new release date was announced as 14 April 2023.

Reception

References

External links 
 

Upcoming Telugu-language films
Hindu mythological films
Films shot in Hyderabad, India
Indian films based on plays
Films scored by Mani Sharma
Films directed by Gunasekhar
Sri Venkateswara Creations films
Upcoming films
Films shot in Telangana
Films shot at Ramoji Film City
Films based on works by Kalidasa
Works based on Shakuntala (play)
Indian 3D films
2023 3D films